Bisby Lodge may refer to:

 Bisby Lodge (bench), a bench in Herkimer County, New York
 Bisby Lodge (historic), a historic location in Herkimer County, New York